Pātūtahi is a small settlement 15 kilometres from Gisborne, in the northeast of New Zealand's North Island. It is located in the valley of the Waipaoa River.

The name was officially modified to include macrons in 2021.

Demographics
It is part of the wider Te Arai statistical area.

Pātūtahi had a population of 330 at the 2018 New Zealand census, an increase of 12 people (3.8%) since the 2013 census, and a decrease of 9 people (−2.7%) since the 2006 census. There were 108 households, comprising 162 males and 168 females, giving a sex ratio of 0.96 males per female, with 84 people (25.5%) aged under 15 years, 66 (20.0%) aged 15 to 29, 129 (39.1%) aged 30 to 64, and 48 (14.5%) aged 65 or older.

Ethnicities were 50.9% European/Pākehā, 64.5% Māori, 0.9% Pacific peoples, and 1.8% other ethnicities. People may identify with more than one ethnicity.

Although some people chose not to answer the census's question about religious affiliation, 56.4% had no religion, 30.0% were Christian, 8.2% had Māori religious beliefs, 0.9% were Buddhist and 1.8% had other religions.

Of those at least 15 years old, 24 (9.8%) people had a bachelor's or higher degree, and 63 (25.6%) people had no formal qualifications. 21 people (8.5%) earned over $70,000 compared to 17.2% nationally. The employment status of those at least 15 was that 120 (48.8%) people were employed full-time, 45 (18.3%) were part-time, and 18 (7.3%) were unemployed.

Parks

Patutahi Soccer Ground is a sports ground in Pātūtahi.

Marae

The area has three marae belonging to the hapū of Te Aitanga-a-Māhaki.

Pakowhai Marae and Te Poho o Hiraina meeting house, and Rongopai Marae and meeting house are a meeting place of Te Whānau a Kai.

Takitimu Marae and Te Poho o Whakarau Oratanga a Tamure meeting house are a meeting place of Ngā Pōtiki and Te Whānau a Kai.

In October 2020, the Government committed $499,625 from the Provincial Growth Fund towards a fire alarm and stormwater upgrade to Rongopai Marae, creating an estimated 7.7 jobs. It also committed $460,500 to upgrade Pakowhai Marae, Takitimu Marae and Ngātapa Marae, creating 13 jobs.

Education

References

Populated places in the Gisborne District